Pervomaysky is a rural locality (a settlement) in Pervomayskoye Rural Settlement, Chagodoshchensky District, Vologda Oblast, Russia. The population was 256 as of 2002. There are 3 streets.

Geography 
Oksyukovo is the nearest rural locality.

References 

Rural localities in Chagodoshchensky District